Ramuntcho is a 1938 French drama film directed by René Barberis and starring Paul Cambo, Louis Jouvet and Madeleine Ozeray. It is based on Pierre Loti's 1897 novel of the same title.

The film's sets were designed by the art director Eugène Lourié.

Cast
 Paul Cambo as Ramuntcho  
 Louis Jouvet as Itchoua  
 Madeleine Ozeray as Gracieuse  
 Line Noro as Franchita  
 Allamon as Fiorentino  
 Françoise Rosay as Dolorès Detcharry  
 Jean Brochard as Boulinguet  
 Nino Constantini as Le brigadier 
 Blanche Denège as La bonne mère  
 Paul Dutourrier as Un contrebandier  
 Jacques Erwin as Arrochkoa  
 Gabrielle Fontan as Pilar Doyamboru  
 René Génin as Le curé  
 Jean Heuzé as Un officier  
 Tony Murcie as Marco  
 Suzanne Nivette as Une soeur  
 Odile Rameau as Pantchika  
 Raymone as La voisine 
 Georges Saillard as Le capitaine  
 Jean Témerson as Salaberry 
 Michèle Alfa 
 Jean Aquistapace 
 Marie Dena 
 Frances Machnik 
 Luis Mariano (singing voice)  
 N. Morgillo  
 Pierre Simonet 
Luong Van Yen

References

Bibliography 
 Philippe Rège. Encyclopedia of French Film Directors, Volume 1. Scarecrow Press, 2009.

External links 
 

1938 films
1938 drama films
French drama films
1930s French-language films
Films directed by René Barberis
Films based on French novels
French black-and-white films
1930s French films